Camarines Norte's at-large congressional district refers to the lone congressional district of the Philippines in the province of Camarines Norte for various national legislatures before 2010. The province first elected its representatives provincewide at-large in 1919 following the dissolution of Ambos Camarines into the present provinces of Camarines Norte and Camarines Sur. It was a single-member district for the final six legislatures of the Insular Government of the Philippine Islands from 1919 to 1935, the three legislatures of the Commonwealth of the Philippines from 1935 to 1946, the seven congresses of the Third Philippine Republic from 1946 to 1972, the national parliament of the Fourth Philippine Republic from 1984 to 1986, and the 8th to 14th congresses of the Fifth Philippine Republic from 1987 to 2010.

On one occasion in its history, Camarines Norte was represented by two members, one elected and one appointed, for the National Assembly of the Second Philippine Republic from 1943 to 1944. Between 1978 and 1984, all provinces were transformed into multi-seat regional at-large districts, with the province forming part of the twelve-seat Region V's at-large district. After the 2009 reapportionment, all representatives were elected from its two congressional districts.

The district was last represented by Liwayway Vinzons-Chato of the Liberal Party (LP).

Representation history

See also
Legislative districts of Camarines Norte

References

Former congressional districts of the Philippines
Politics of Camarines Norte
1919 establishments in the Philippines
2009 disestablishments in the Philippines
At-large congressional districts of the Philippines
Congressional districts of the Bicol Region
Constituencies established in 1919
Constituencies disestablished in 2009